Pink Tights is a surviving 1920 American silent romantic comedy-drama film directed by B. Reeves Eason and starring Gladys Walton. It was produced and released by Universal Film Manufacturing Company.

A print is held by the Danish Film Institute.

Cast 
Gladys Walton as Mazie Darton
Jack Perrin as Rev. Jonathan Meek
Dave Winter as Jerry McKeen
Stanton Heck as Bullato
Rosa Gore as Mrs. Shamfeller
Dan Crimmins as Smiley Dodd
Dorothea Wolbert as Mrs. Bump
B. Reeves Eason, Jr. as Johnny Bump
Martin Neilan as Willie Shamfeller

References

External links 

1920 films
American silent feature films
Films directed by B. Reeves Eason
Universal Pictures films
American black-and-white films
American romantic comedy-drama films
1920 romantic comedy films
1920s American films
Silent romantic comedy-drama films
1920s romantic comedy-drama films
Silent American comedy-drama films
1920 comedy-drama films